St. Cenydd School is located in Caerphilly, South Wales. Situated in extensive grounds, with panoramic views of the semi-rural Caerphilly basin, St. Cenydd is a popular, mixed, 11-18 community school of over 1,100 pupils.

Sporting Honours 
St Cenydd Year 11 Rugby squad won the Caerphilly county rugby cup in the 2014 - 2015 season by defeating local rivals St Martin's comprehensive. It was a hotly contested match with St Cenydd holding onto their lead to win the cup.
 
George Gasson a former pupil at St Cenydd, is now playing rugby at a high level. He has even been selected in the U-18s and U-20s squad for wales. He currently plays for Newport Gwent Dragons.

Thomas Payne completed a 5 km run in under 30 minutes on his park run debut.

Facilities 
St. Cenydd is the designated centre for hearing impaired, physically disabled, and speech and language pupils within the area, with facilities for both special-needs and able-bodied students.

Notable teachers 

 Steve Fenwick, a former Welsh rugby union player, was a teacher here in the 1970s and 80s
 Vikki Howells, a Member of the Senedd, was a history teacher here prior to her election in 2016
 Martin Williams was a history teacher who won the Teacher of the Year in a Secondary School award for the Welsh region in 2002

External links 
St. Cenydd School Website
Another St. Cenydd School Website

Secondary schools in Caerphilly County Borough